Aagot Kristine Støkken (July 13, 1923 – February 4, 2008) was a Norwegian actress.

Støkken was born in Christiania (now Oslo), Norway. She engaged with the Oslo New Theater from 1947 to 1958, and after that with the People's Theater, Trøndelag Theater, and Norwegian Opera and Ballet. Støkken made her debut as a screen actress in Vi vil leve, and she appeared in six films between 1946 and 1975. She is buried in Vestre Gravlund in Oslo.

Filmography
 1946: Vi vil leve as Sussie Holm
 1957: Hjemme hos oss. Husmorfilmen 1957
 1958: Ut av mørket
 1971: Full utrykning as Mrs. Tellefsen
 1973: To fluer i ett smekk as a woman
 1975: Skraphandlerne as Aunt Tone

References

External links
 
 Aagot Støkken at Sceneweb
 Aagot Støkken at the Swedish Film Database
 Aagot Støkken at Filmfront

1923 births
2008 deaths
20th-century Norwegian actresses
Actresses from Oslo